Ali Hasan (born 23 May 1965) is a Kuwaiti fencer. He competed in the team épée event at the 1984 Summer Olympics.

References

External links
 

1965 births
Living people
Kuwaiti male épée fencers
Olympic fencers of Kuwait
Fencers at the 1984 Summer Olympics
Fencers at the 1998 Asian Games
Asian Games competitors for Kuwait
20th-century Kuwaiti people